Babaoshan Station is a station on Line 1 of the Beijing Subway. It is located near the Babaoshan Revolutionary Cemetery.

Station Layout 
The station has an underground island platform.

Exits 
The station has four exits, lettered A, B, C and D. All exits are accessible.

Gallery

References

Beijing Subway stations in Shijingshan District
Railway stations in China opened in 1971